is a private women's junior college in Kanazawa, Ishikawa, Japan, established in 1979.

External links
 Official website 

Japanese junior colleges
Educational institutions established in 1979
Private universities and colleges in Japan
Universities and colleges in Ishikawa Prefecture
1979 establishments in Japan
Women's universities and colleges in Japan